The 2012–13 season was Peterhead's second consecutive season in the Scottish Third Division, having been relegated from the Scottish Second Division at the end of the 2010–11 season. Peterhead also competed in the Challenge Cup, League Cup and the Scottish Cup.

Results & fixtures

Scottish Third Division

Second Division play-offs

Scottish Challenge Cup

Scottish League Cup

Scottish Cup

Player statistics

Squad 
Last updated 17 May 2013 

|}
a.  Includes other competitive competitions, including the play-offs and the Challenge Cup.

Disciplinary record
Includes all competitive matches.
Last updated 17 May 2013

Awards

Last updated 28 September 2012

Team statistics

League table

Division summary

Transfers

Players in

Players out

See also
List of Peterhead F.C. seasons

References

Peterhead F.C. seasons
Peterhead